Pushkara is the younger brother of Nala, the king of the Nishadas featured in the Mahabharata. Scheming with the asura Kali, he defeated Nala in a manipulated game of dice, robbing him of his kingdom and riches. Nala later defeats him in a rematch, and is restored as the king. Despite his actions and lust for Nala's wife, Damayanti, Pushkara is forgiven, and the brothers make their peace with each other.

Sources
Dowson's Classical Dictionary of Hindu Mythology 

Characters in Hindu mythology

References 
Characters in the Mahabharata